Tim Coleman (1881–1940) was an English footballer.

Tim Coleman may also refer to:
Ernie Coleman (1908–1984), footballer, who was sometimes nicknamed "Tim"
Tim Coleman (cricketer, born 1971), English cricketer
Tim Coleman (18th-century cricketer), English cricketer
Tim Coleman, a fictional character in the Australian soap opera Home and Away

See also
Timothy Colman (1929–2021), British multi-millionaire and previous Lord Lieutenant of Norfolk